WLIN may refer to:

 WLIN (AM), a radio station (1380 AM) licensed to serve Waynesboro, Pennsylvania, United States
 WLIN-FM, a radio station (101.1 FM) licensed to serve Durant, Mississippi, United States